Sex and Zen II ("The Carnal Prayer Mat II - Jade Maiden Heart Sutra") is a 1996 Hong Kong erotic comedy film directed by Chin Man Kei. The film is a sequel to Sex and Zen (1991), and it was followed by Sex and Zen III (1998).

Background
Sex and Zen II is partially an adaptation of the Tsui Hark film The Lovers, which is itself based on Butterfly Lovers and the lead actor Elvis Tsui's character Sai Moon-Kin (西門堅, pinyin: Xīmén Jiān) is related to the Water Margin character and Jin Ping Mei protagonist Ximen Qing. The film's Chinese title and the martial arts sequences are a reference to the Jade Maiden Heart Sutra (玉女心經, Yùnǚxīnjīng), a fictional scripture in Jin Yong's The Return of the Condor Heroes.

Plot 
Sai Moon-Kin (Tsui) is a rich man who lives with his concubines and his son and a daughter named Yiau (Loletta Lee), who is raised like a boy and is ignorant of the ways of love. Because her brother is intellectually disabled, Yiau wants to be her father's heir but feels that she needs to go to school for the required education. Her desire to attend school leads her to a love affair with a lustful young scholar (Ken Lok). Only after she is equipped by a protective chastity belt, does her father let Yiau go to school, guised in drag.

Sai Moon finds his son's new wife Siu-Tsui (Shu Qi) attractive. He does not realize that she is the evil Mirage Lady, who knows "sucking" magic. Yiau and the Iron Man (Ben Ng) try to stop the Mirage Lady from harming any more people.

Cast 
 Loletta Lee as Yiau
 Ken Lok as Fa
 Ben Ng as Ironman
 Shu Qi as Mirage Lady/Siu-Tsui
 Elvis Tsui as Sai Moon-Kin
 Wong Yat Fei as Monk

References

External links 
 
 lovehkfilm entry

1996 films
Sex and Zen
Demons in film
Hong Kong sex comedy films
1990s Hong Kong films